Mukundraj (IAST: Mukundarāja) was one of the earliest Marathi literary figures poet. Some earlier scholars dated him to the 12th century.

Scholars do not have unanimity among them about the place where Mukundraj mostly lived. He was probably born at Pauni in Bhandara district. There is a samadhi (monument) of Mukundraj at Ambajogai in the Beed district of Maharashtra Marathwada.

Mukundraj belonged to the Nath sect, and was a follower of the Adi Shankaracharya's Advaita philosophy. He wrote the religious compositions Vivek Sindhu (IAST: Vivekasindhu) and Paramamrut (IAST: Paramamṛta). Some earlier scholars dated Vivekasindhu to 1188, and believed it to be the first work of literature in Marathi language. However, Mukundraj is now generally dated to 12th century or later: the Vivekasindhu was likely written after other Marathi works such as Lilacaritra and Dnyaneshwari.

References

Bibliography 

 

Marathi-language poets
Marathi-language writers
14th-century Indian poets
People from Bhandara district
Year of birth uncertain
Year of death uncertain
Indian male poets
Poets from Maharashtra